Babes in the Wood is a traditional English children's tale, as well as a popular pantomime subject. It has also been the name of some other unrelated works. The expression has passed into common language, referring to inexperienced innocents entering unawares into any potentially dangerous or hostile situation.

Traditional tale 
The traditional children's tale is of two children abandoned in a wood, who die and are covered with leaves by robins.

It was first published as an anonymous broadside ballad by Thomas Millington in Norwich in 1595 with the title "The Norfolk gent his will and Testament and howe he Commytted the keepinge of his Children to his own brother whoe delte most wickedly with them and howe God plagued him for it".

The tale has been reworked in many forms; it frequently appears attributed as a Mother Goose rhyme.  Around 1840, Richard Barham included a spoof of the story in his Ingoldsby Legends, under the title of The Babes in the Wood; or, the Norfolk Tragedy. Harris cheekily claims in an endnote that the true history of the children is, 'or ought to be,' in "Bloomfield's [sic] History of Norfolk", but that work's Wayland section does not mention it. The anonymous ballad was also illustrated by Randolph Caldecott in a book published in London in 1879.

The story tells of two small children left in the care of an uncle and aunt after their parents' death. The uncle gives the children to ruffians to be killed, in order to acquire their inheritance, telling his wife they are being sent to London for their upbringing. The murderers fall out, and the milder of the two kills the other. He tells the children he will return with provisions, but they do not see him again. The children wander alone in the woods until they die; their bodies are covered with leaves by the birds. Like many morality tales, the story continues with a description of the retribution befalling the uncle. In sanitized versions, the children are bodily taken to Heaven. The story ends with a warning to those who have to take care of orphans and others' children not to inflict God's wrath upon themselves.
The story is also used as a basis for pantomimes. However, for various reasons including both the brevity of the original and the target pantomime audience of young children, modern pantomimes by this name usually combine this story with parts of the modern Robin Hood story (employing the supporting characters from it, such as Maid Marian, rather than Robin himself) to lengthen it.

Adaptions

Live-action short
Fox Film produced a 36-minute short of the story, The Babes in the Woods, adapted by screenwriter Bernard McConville in 1917. Fox's treatment included a wicked witch and a house of candy, elements borrowed from the Hansel and Gretel folk story. This film provides a happy ending for the children, with Robin Hood and his company rescuing them in the end.

Animated short
The Walt Disney Company re-worked this tale for their 1932 short animated film Babes in the Woods, incorporating some material from Hansel and Gretel by the Brothers Grimm, and adding a village of friendly elves (a feature not traditionally present in either tale) and a happy ending.

TV pantomime
On Christmas Eve 1973, Junior Showtime did a Babes on the Wood pantomime episode at Bradford Alhambra. It starred Bobby Bennett as Robin Hood, Peter Goodwright as Alan A'Dale, Susan Maughan as Maid Marian, Roy Rolland as Nanny Riley, John Gower as the Sheriff of Nottingham, Eddie Large as Private Large, Syd Little as Private Little, Colin Prince as Little John, Norman Collier as Will Scarlett, Bonnie Langford as Babe Tilly, and Mark Curry as Babe Willy.

Other cultural references 
The 1915 Broadway musical Very Good Eddie featured a song entitled "Babes in the Wood" by composer Jerome Kern and lyricist Schuyler Greene. Main character Eddie Kettle comforts former love Elsie Darling in a duet in which each refers to the traditional tale.

Eddie: 
Then put on your little hood,
And we'll both be, Oh, so good!
Like the babes in the wood.

Elsie: 
When the babes were lost in the gloomy wood,
It's no wonder they were so very good.
Fourteen angels were watching them,
So all the story books state,
Sandman's coming now, it is getting late.

A recording of this song was included in the 1993 CD Jerome Kern Treasury, sung by Hugh Panaro (Eddie) and Rebecca Luker (Elsie) conducted by John McGlinn (Angel CDC 7 54883 2).

Several murders of children in English-speaking countries have been nicknamed the "Babes in the Wood murders":
Babes in the Wood murders (Pine Grove Furnace), 1934; between Maryland and Pennsylvania, USA
Babes in the Wood murders (Stanley Park), ; Vancouver, Canada
Babes in the Wood murders (Epping Forest), 1970; Essex, England
Babes in the Wood murders (Brighton), 1986; Sussex, England

Folklore 
Folklore has it that the events told in Babes in the Wood originally happened in Wayland Wood in Norfolk, England. It is said that the uncle lived at the nearby Griston Hall. The ghosts of the murdered children are said to haunt Wayland Wood. The village signs at Griston and nearby Watton depict the story. In the folklore version, the uncle resents the task and pays two men to take the children into the woods and kill them. Finding themselves unable to go through with the act, the criminals abandon the children in the wood where, unable to fend for themselves, they eventually die.

Another version, from Lancashire, has it that the tale is based on real events of 1374, when "the villainous Robert de Holland" illegally seized the land of 13 year-old Roger de Langley and his young bride. The children flee to the nearby woods and are cared for by loyal retainers until they are rescued by their legal guardian John of Gaunt.

Song

There is a song that seems to deal with the story that is also named "babes in the woods". It is a summary rather than a detailed telling.

Notes

References
 
 
   This includes the text of the Thomas Millington ballad.
   This is the Mother Goose rhyme.

External links 

The Babes in the Wood PDF with Lesson Plans

The Babes in the Wood The Babes in the Wood song lyrics with illustrations
The history of English pantomime
History of the story and its descendent versions
The Abandoned Children of Wailing Wood Animated and narrated version of the legend
Multiple fully online versions of Babes in the Wood from the University of Florida's Baldwin Library of Historical Children's Literature
Alternative origin for the Babes in the Wood Legend Agecroft Hall, near Prestwich, England)
babesinthewoods.skyrock.com 
 https://maxhunter.missouristate.edu/songinformation.aspx?ID=1592

English fairy tales
Pantomime
Traditional ballads